西山 is an East Asian name meaning "Western mountain" or "Western mountains".

西山 may refer to:
 Xishan (disambiguation) (xīshān), the Chinese pinyin transliteration
 Nishiyama (disambiguation), the Japanese transliteration of native Japanese reading
 Seizan, Japanese transliteration of borrowed Chinese reading
 Shōkū, Buddhist monk, also called Seizan
 Seizan, Buddhist sect, named for the monk